Blantyre Greyhound Stadium was a greyhound racing and speedway stadium in Blantyre, South Lanarkshire, near Glasgow.

The track opened on 6 October 1933 as an independent (unlicensed) track and was popular with the miners from the pit well and Whistleberry colliery. The track was owned by Frank Doonin and it also hosted the Glasgow Tigers from 1977-1981. It closed on 22 April 1982 and the site was redeveloped to incorporate the new A725 road (linking the town to the M74 motorway).

References

Defunct greyhound racing venues in the United Kingdom
Greyhound racing in Scotland
Blantyre, South Lanarkshire
Sports venues demolished in 1982
Sports venues completed in 1933
1933 establishments in Scotland
1982 disestablishments in Scotland